The Electrical Water Pageant is a show that takes place every evening (weather permitting) on Walt Disney World's Seven Seas Lagoon and Bay Lake. It features 14 floats with lights that depict images of sea creatures. Though it has changed somewhat since its debut in 1971, it remains one of the few original opening year shows to still be running at Walt Disney World.

1971 Version

On Monday October 25, 1971; the Electrical Water Pageant premiered on the Seven Seas Lagoon and Bay Lake for "Dedication Day" at Walt Disney World. In addition to the 14 floats, its opening night included fireworks and pyrotechnics launched from the 14 floats and an additional float behind the Electrical Water Pageant. All of this was filmed by Walt Disney Productions and edited down for inclusion into The Wonderful World of Disney's Episode: "The Grand Opening of Walt Disney World", which aired on NBC on Friday October 29, 1971. The Paul Beaver  version of Gershon Kingsley & Jean-Jacques Perrey's "Baroque Hoedown", created specially for the Electrical Water Pageant, was used from 1971 until 1977. The original Main Street Electrical Parade at Disneyland used the same soundtrack from 1972 until 1974. In 1977, the premiers of the updated version of the Disneyland Main Street Electrical Parade and new (but similar) Walt Disney World Main Street Electrical Parade used a new version of "Baroque Hoedown" updated by Don Dorsey.

The original lineup of floats for the Electrical Water Pageant were:

 Sea Serpent (three floats)
 Whale (one float)
 Two Sea Lions Playing With a Ball (one float)
 Clamshell Opening and Closing revealing a mermaid (one float)
 Three Mermaids (one float)
 Three Jumping Dolphins (three floats)
 Octopus (one float)
 Three Flying Fish (one float)
 Four Seahorses (one float)
 Neptune (one float)

While the 1971 version of "Baroque Hoedown" would play along with the Electrical Water Pageant through 1976, Disney melodies were added to the track and some of the floats were repositioned and others completely changed in 1972; and remained that way through 1976. While the track was essentially the same as what was heard during the Main Street Electrical Parade at Disneyland, an oscillator swoop was heard during the music transitions in the Electrical Water Pageant.

The 1972 to 1976 lineup of floats for the Electrical Water Pageant were:

 Sea Serpent (three floats)
 Two Sea Lions Playing With a Ball (one float)
 Whale (one float)
 Turtle (one float)
 Red Squid (one float)
 Three Jumping Dolphins (three floats)
 Three Flying Fish (one float) 
 Octopus (one float) (updated later in 1973)
 Four Seahorses (one float)
 Neptune (one float)

1977 to 1995 Version

With the return of the Disneyland Main Street Electrical Parade in an updated form along with the brand new Walt Disney World Main Street Electrical Parade, a new version of Jean-Jacques Perry & Gershon Kingsley's "Baroque Hoedown" was created in 1977 to be used with both parades respectively featuring an updated rendition of Barque Hoedown recorded by Don Dorsey. To help distinguish the Electrical Water Pageant from the Main Street Electrical Parade, the original Kingsley-Perry version of "Baroque Hoedown" was dropped and a new version using various musical selections was created for both the opening and closing of the Electrical Water Pageant as well as each creature depicted in the pageant. Some of the original 1971 floats were saved or rearranged, while others were completely changed. The main themes for this version of the Electrical Water Pageant were synthesized arrangements from George Frideric Handel's Water Music.

The 1977 to 1995 lineup of floats for the Electrical Water Pageant were:
 Overture- "Hornpipe"
 Sea Serpent (four floats) "That Certain Serpent"- J. Christensen
 Whale (one float) "Whale Of A Tale" N. Gimbel/A Hoffman
 Turtle (one float) (An updated version of the 1972 Turtle) "I'm A Turtle" D. Dorsey
 Octopus (one float) "Up In Arms" D. Dorsey
 Three Jumping Dolphins (three floats) "Waltz Almost" - J. Christensen
 Brachiosaurus (one float) "Up In Arms" Reprise - D. Dorsey
 Sea Monster (one float) (Later became a Crocodile in 1982) Bay-Sea Monster -J. Christensen
 Four Seahorses (one float) (An updated version of the 1971 Four Seahorses)
 Neptune (one float) (An updated version of the 1971 Neptune) "Hornpipe" (Reprise) mixed w/ all other themes
 Stars & Stripes Patriotic Medley
 Traveling Music: "The Bouree" - G.F. Handel

From October 1, 1981 – October 1, 1982, in honor of Walt Disney World's 10th anniversary, the Patriotic Finale music was replaced w/ the Tencennial theme song.

1996 to 2023 Version

The Electrical Water Pageant that guests see today consists of the same floats in the same formation dating back to 1977. The only difference is in 1996 when a new musical score was created for both the opening and closing of the Electrical Water Pageant as well as each creature depicted in the pageant. During a brief time, during summer 2016, the crocodile float was removed after the incident in which a 2 year old child was killed in an alligator attack in June 2016. As of 8/3/2016, the Crocodile Float was re-added into the Parade.

The 1996 to 2023 lineup of floats and music are:

Opening: "Fanfare" from The Little Mermaid
 Sea Serpent (four floats) "Boo Bop Bopbop Bop (I Love You Too)" from Pete's Dragon
 Whale (one float) (Updated later in 1997) "Whale of a Tale" from 20,000 Leagues Under the Sea
 Turtle (one float)
 Octopus (one float) "Poor Unfortunate Souls" from The Little Mermaid
 Three Jumping Dolphins (three floats)
 Brachiosaurus (one float) "Walk the Dinosaur" by Was (Not Was)
 Crocodile (one float) "Never Smile at a Crocodile" from Peter Pan
 Four Seahorses (one float) "Fanfare" & "Under the Sea" from The Little Mermaid
 Neptune (one float) "Fanfare" & "Under the Sea" from The Little Mermaid
All floats then change to the American Flag & Stars as they have been doing since 1971: (9 Piece) - "You're a Grand Old Flag", "Yankee Doodle", & "America the Beautiful"

Closing: "Fireworks" & "Jig" from The Little Mermaid

2023 to Present Version
The 2023 to present lineup of floats and music are:

Opening: "Electric Fanfare" from Main Street Electrical Parade
 Sea Serpent (four floats) "Boo Bop Bopbop Bop (I Love You Too)" from Pete's Dragon
 Whale (one float) "Whale of a Tale" from 20,000 Leagues Under the Sea
 Turtle (one float) "The Turtle Lope" from Finding Nemo
 Octopus (one float) "Poor Unfortunate Souls" from The Little Mermaid
 Three Jumping Dolphins (three floats) "Beyond the Sea" by Charles Trenet
 Brachiosaurus (one float) "Walk the Dinosaur" by Was (Not Was)
 Crocodile (one float) "Never Smile at a Crocodile" from Peter Pan
 Four Seahorses (one float) "Fanfare" & "Under the Sea" from The Little Mermaid
 Neptune (one float) "Fanfare" & "Under the Sea" from The Little Mermaid
All floats then change to the American Flag & Stars as they have been doing since 1971: (9 Piece) - "The Stars and Stripes Forever"

Closing: "Exit Music" from Fantasmic!

External links

Walt Disney World
Walt Disney Parks and Resorts attractions
Walt Disney Parks and Resorts parades
1971 establishments in Florida